The National Book Critics Circle Award for Nonfiction, established in 1976, is an annual American literary award presented by the National Book Critics Circle (NBCC) to promote "the finest books and reviews published in English." Awards are presented annually to books published in the U.S. during the preceding calendar year in six categories: Fiction, Nonfiction, Poetry, Memoir/Autobiography, Biography, and Criticism.

Books previously published in English are not eligible, such as re-issues and paperback editions. They do consider "translations, short story and essay collections, self published books, and any titles that fall under the general categories."

The judges are the volunteer directors of the NBCC who are 24 members serving rotating three-year terms, with eight elected annually by the voting members, namely "professional book review editors and book reviewers." Winners of the awards are announced each year at the NBCC awards ceremony in conjunction with the yearly membership meeting, which takes place in March.

Recipients

See also 
 Ivan Sandrof Lifetime Achievement Award
 John Leonard Prize
 National Book Critics Circle Awards
 National Book Critics Circle Award for Biography
 National Book Critics Circle Award for Criticism
 National Book Critics Circle Award for Fiction
 National Book Critics Circle Award for Memoir and Autobiography
 National Book Critics Circle Award for Poetry
 Nona Balakian Citation for Excellence in Reviewing

References

External links 

 Official website

Awards established in 1976
American literary awards
20th-century literary awards
21st-century literary awards
English-language literary awards
American non-fiction literary awards